The men's C-1 5000 metres competition at the 2017 ICF Canoe Sprint World Championships in Račice took place at the Sportcentrum Račice.

Schedule
The schedule was as follows:

All times are Central European Summer Time (UTC+2)

Results
As a long-distance event, it was held as a direct final.

References

ICF